Khamis Harash is a sub-district located in Kharif District, 'Amran Governorate, Yemen. Khamis Harash had a population of 10822  according to the 2004 census.

References 

Sub-districts in Kharif District